Sirok is a village in Heves County, Hungary.

Sirok may also refer to:
 Mark Sirõk (born 1989), Russian-Estonian political activist
 Matija Širok (born 1991), Slovene footballer

See also